Aegidius Strauch (21 February 1632 – 13 December 1682) was a German mathematician and theologian.

Life 

Aegidius Strauch was born in Wittenberg, the son of the Electoral Councillor Johann Strauch. As early as 1646 he attended lectures at Wittenberg University and worked in the fields of history, mathematics and oriental languages. In 1649 he moved to the University of Leipzig, where he continued his language studies and devoted himself to the study of theology. In 1650 he returned to Wittenberg, and on 29 April 1651, became a doctor of philosophy.

He was appointed adjunct professor of the Faculty of Philosophy on October 18, 1653, and, in 1656, professor of Mathematics as substitute of Reinhold Frankenberger. On 9 February 1658, Strauch married Martha Magarethe Sibylle Cranach (born 29 September 1634 in Wachsdorf). After Frankenberger's death, he took over as professor in 1664 as substitute for his brother Michael Strauch, who took over in 1565. Instead, Strauch took over the professorship for history and was subsequently able to devote himself to theological studies. In 1655 he received permission from the theological faculty to hold public lectures. Strauch became a theological licentiate in 1657, a doctor of theology on October 13, 1662, and in 1666 he was appointed as assessor of the theological faculty at Wittenberg University.

Because of the disputes with Friedrich Ulrich Calixt, he followed a call as pastor of the Trinity Church and rector of the Gymnasium in Gdańsk. 

He was a polemic against calvinists, syncretists, and papists and criticized them from the pulpit and in writings. When, in 1673, he blamed the death of the king of Poland and did not comply with the Council's attempts to reach an agreement, he was dismissed on 28 December 1673. However, Strauch had gained respect for the common people who forced the Council of Danzig to reinstate him on 4 January 1674.

However when he went to Greifswald in 1675, he was imprisoned in Küstrin. It was only when the Electorate of Saxony and the King of Poland asked the Elector of Brandenburg for his release, that he was released on 9 July 1678. Strauch returned to Gdansk after his release on July 20, 1678, and was reinstated by the Gdansk Council on September 8, 1678. Eventually the disputes with the Danzig clergy were settled. Strauch died on 13 December 1682 in Gdańsk.

Works

References 

1632 births
1682 deaths
17th-century German mathematicians
17th-century German Protestant theologians